The 1973 Grand Prix of Sweden was a Formula One motor race held at the Scandinavian Raceway, Anderstorp on 17 June 1973. It was race 7 of 15 in both the 1973 World Championship of Drivers and the 1973 International Cup for Formula One Manufacturers. The 80-lap race was won by McLaren driver Denny Hulme after he started from sixth position. Ronnie Peterson finished second for the Lotus team and Tyrrell driver François Cevert came in third.

Ronnie Peterson's success with John Player Team Lotus was the catalyst for a Swedish Grand Prix and the race was held for the first time, at World Championship level, at the grandly-named Scandinavian Raceway in 1973.

Background

Entry

A total of 29 F1 cars were entered for this event, however only 22 arrived for the race. The field was smaller than usual as there was no time for teams to repair damaged cars after the Monaco, as they had to be transported 1,200 miles from Monaco to Anderstorp.

A number of drivers were missing from action; Arturo Merzario (Scuderia Ferrari), Chris Amon (Martini Racing Team Tecno), Andrea de Adamich (Ceramica Pagnossin Brabham)., David Purley (LEC Refrigeration Racing March) and James Hunt (Hesketh Racing March).  Meanwhile, Nanni Galli had decided to retire, so Frank Williams Racing Cars entered Danish driver, Tom Belsø, however it became clear that there was no funding available from his sponsors for the race. Swedish driver, Reine Wisell had rented LEC's March 731.

Qualifying

Ronnie Peterson did not disappoint his fans in qualifying, taking pole in his Lotus 72E from Tyrrell's François Cevert. Cevert came close to taking pole, but Peterson took it by just 0.089 of a second. The World Championship contenders shared the second row, with Jackie Stewart ahead of Emerson Fittipaldi, while Carlos Reutemann and Denny Hulme made the third row.

Qualifying classification

Race 
The race was held over 80 laps of the Scandinavian Raceway circuit, in front of a crowd of over 50,000 spectators. There was a delayed start caused by the Grand Prix Drivers' Association complaining about photographers in dangerous places around the circuit.

Emerson Fittipaldi made the best start and grabbed second behind local hero, Ronnie Peterson. The Tyrrell 006 of François Cevert was third with teammate Jackie Stewart behind him. Carlos Reutemann and Denny Hulme completed the top six, although by lap four, the McLaren of Hulme had moved ahead of the Brabham. The order remained stable until Stewart passed Cevert and began to chase the two JPS Lotuses. By this time, Cevert was having trouble with his tyres and dropped back and was overtaken by Hulme on lap 62. Hulme then started close in on Stewart.

For 70 laps it looked like this was going to be a one-two for John Player Team Lotus with Peterson first and reigning World Champion, Fittipaldi second. However disaster struck when Fittipaldi retired with gearbox failure. With just three laps to go, Hulme overtook Stewart, when the Scot suffered a rear brake failure. Hulme quickly closed the gap on the leader, Peterson having major trouble with tyre wear and fighting to stay on the track.

On the 79th and penultimate lap Hulme was able to pass the local hero to snatch victory, the New Zealander's decision to run harder tyres on his McLaren-Cosworth M23 having paid off. Peterson was powerless to defend and eventually finished four seconds adrift  in second place, that was as close as any Swede came to winning on home soil. Hulme expressed sadness to "have taken that away from Ronnie." Cevert was a further 10.6 seconds behind Peterson.

Race classification

Championship standings after the race

Drivers' Championship standings

Constructors' Championship standings

Note: Only the top five positions are included for both sets of standings.

References

Swedish Grand Prix
Swedish Grand Prix
Grand Prix
Swedish Grand Prix